Sun Xipeng (born 1 July 1999) is a Chinese footballer currently playing as a forward for Qingdao Hainiu.

Club career
Sun Xipeng would play for the Shanghai Shenhua youth team before being promoted to their senior team and then loaned out to second tier club Shanghai Shenxin on 27 February 2019. He would go on to make his professional debut on 9 March 2019 in a league game against Changchun Yatai that ended in a 4-1 defeat. This would be followed by his first goal, which was in a league game on 6 April 2019 against Shijiazhuang Ever Bright in a 3-2 defeat. On his return he would be loaned out again to third tier clubs Qingdao Jonoon. He would remain in Qingdao for another loan period with Qingdao Kangtine.

On 28 April 2022, Sun would transfer to top tier club Chongqing Liangjiang Athletic. He would not get a chance to play for them after the club was dissolved on 24 May 2022 after the majority owner, Wuhan Dangdai Group could not restructure the clubs shareholdings and debt. Sun would be free to join third tier club Zibo Qisheng on 13 June 2022. On 31 August 2022 he would join second tier club Qingdao Hainiu. He would be part of the squad that gained promotion to the top tier at the end of the 2022 China League One campaign.

Career statistics
.

References

External links
Sun Xipeng at Worldfootball.net

1999 births
Living people
Chinese footballers
China youth international footballers
Association football forwards
Shanghai Shenhua F.C. players
Shanghai Shenxin F.C. players